Elisabeth Kehrer (born 15 February 1961, in Vienna)  was the Austrian Consul General in Chicago.  Kehrer was also Ambassador to Finland and Austria's first ambassador to Malta.

In 1984 Kehrer was awarded a Doctorate of Laws (LL.D.) from  the University of Vienna, and during 1984 and 1985 undertook postgraduate studies in Comparative Constitutional Law for which she was awarded a Diplôme Supérieur by Panthéon-Assas University in France.

From 1983 to 1986, Kehrer worked as a tutor and assistant professor in the Department of Constitutional and Administrative Law within the University of Vienna, and from 1986 to 1988 she worked as a Research Assistant in the Austrian Constitutional Court. From 1988 to 1990 she worked for the Department of International Law in the Austrian Federal Ministry for Foreign Affairs, and from 1990 to 1994 was posted as the First Secretary/Counsellor at the Permanent Representation of Austria to the United Nations in New York. From 1994 to 1997 she was the Counsellor and DCM at the Austrian Embassy in Dublin, and from 1997 to 2001 she was the Head of the Coordination Desk for Common Foreign and Security Policy of the European Union and European Correspondent in the Political Division of the Federal Ministry for Foreign Affairs in Vienna.
  
From 2001 to 2005, Kehrer was the Austrian Consul General at Chicago, before leaving to become the Austrian Ambassador to Malta in 2005, in which post she remained until 2007.

References

1961 births
Diplomats from Vienna
Living people
University of Vienna alumni
Austrian women ambassadors
Ambassadors of Austria to Finland
Ambassadors of Austria to Malta